Dmitry Nikolayevich Arkhipov (born 1 April 1981) is a Russian freestyle skier. He competed at the 2002 Winter Olympics and the 2006 Winter Olympics.

References

1981 births
Living people
Russian male freestyle skiers
Olympic freestyle skiers of Russia
Freestyle skiers at the 2002 Winter Olympics
Freestyle skiers at the 2006 Winter Olympics
People from Chirchiq